Mirelle Arciniega Sevenello (born 13 August 1992) is a Mexican footballer who plays as an attacking midfielder for Liga MX Femenil side Club Puebla and the Mexico women's national team.

International career
Arciniega represented Mexico at the 2010 CONCACAF Women's U-20 Championship and the 2010 FIFA U-20 Women's World Cup. She made her senior debut on 5 March 2020 in a 1–1 friendly draw against Croatia.

References

External links 
 

1992 births
Living people
Women's association football midfielders
Mexican women's footballers
Footballers from Puebla
People from Puebla (city)
Mexican people of Italian descent
Mexico women's international footballers
Liga MX Femenil players
Club Puebla players
Mexican footballers